Ángel Ramos (born December 30, 1949) is current Principal of Hawaii School for the Deaf and the Blind. He was the founder of the National Hispanic Council of the Deaf and Hard of Hearing, He was also Former Superintendent of the Idaho School for the Deaf and the Blind, Sequoia School for the Deaf and Hard of Hearing (AZ) and Marie Katzenbach School for the Deaf (New Jersey). He is the second deaf Hispanic/Latino to receive a doctorate degree (Dr. Robert Davila was the first) and the first to receive a doctorate from Gallaudet University.

Early years
Ramos' mother, Maria Monserrate, was born in Mayaguez, Puerto Rico. His father, Miguel Angel Ramos, was born in Vieques, Puerto Rico. After his parents were married they moved to New York City. When Ramos mother got pregnant with Angel, her husband demanded that she have an abortion or he would divorce her. Ramos' mother went ahead and gave birth to Angel and shortly afterwards his parents got divorced. As result, he and his sister were raised solely by his mother, who worked as a seamstress. They grew up in the housing projects of NYC, in Manhattan, along with a number of relatives. Ramos attended public school, leading a normal child's life until 1959 when, while nine years old, he woke up one morning and could not hear. As a Catholic and altar boy, he thought God had punished him and hid his hearing loss from his mother for two years. He succeeded in school since he could already read and write in English and Spanish, and was able to  follow directions on the classroom blackboard and by reading his textbooks carefully. By 1961, he had learned to lip-read and this helped him to get by elementary school all the way to high school.

Academic education
Despite being poor and being raised by a single parent, Ramos was able to pursue a college education thanks to financial support from the NY Division of Vocational Rehabilitation. He attended and graduated from Manhattan College in 1971 with a Bachelor of Science degree in Mathematics. Unable to find employment due to being deaf, he drove a taxi in NYC and until he was hired as a gym supervisor at Lexington School for the Deaf in NY— with his only pay being room and board. Eventually, he became a Teacher Assistant at St. Joseph's School for the Deaf.

Dissatisfied with being a Teacher Assistant and wanting a better future, Ramos applied for, and received, financial assistance from the NY Division of Vocational Rehabilitation to pursue a master's degree. He attended the State University of New York at Genesio where he earned a Master of Science degree in Education of the Deaf.  After working at the New York School for the Deaf as a math teacher for three years, he received a full scholarship to the National Leadership Program at the California State University at Northridge where he earned a second master's degree in Educational Administration. After working at the National Technical Institute for the Deaf and the Southwest Collegiate Institute for the Deaf for several years, he received another scholarship to pursue a doctorate degree in Educational Administration and Supervision from Gallaudet University in Washington, D.C. He became the first, and only, deaf Hispanic/Latino to receive a doctorate degree from Gallaudet in 1997. Ramos held a teaching position at Lamar University in Beaumont, Texas and was Director of the Gallaudet University Regional Center in Texas. During that time he received a Fulbright Scholar Award and was assigned to Colombia to improve the delivery of educational services to students who are deaf and hard of hearing. He is the founder the National Hispanic Council of the Deaf and Hard of Hearing in Washington, D.C.

Superintendent of the Idaho School for the Deaf and the Blind
On August 1, 2001, Ramos was hired as Superintendent of the Idaho School for the Deaf and the Blind, located in Gooding, Idaho. The executive director of the Idaho State Board of Education, Dr. Gregory Fitch, instructed Ramos to change the "custodial" school to an "educational" school. After Dr. Fitch resigned as executive director, the old timers at the school - who were dissatisfied with the changes Ramos was making at the school and preferred the old custodial model - convinced the Idaho State Board of Education (BOE) to take steps to remove Ramos as superintendent, On July 30, 2003, the State BOE put Ramos on administrative leave due to charges that he illegally sold state surplus property, that he had a conflict of interest in preferential hiring, and the appearances of retaliation against detractors. Supporters of Ramos stated that he raised the bar of education in the school and in September 2003, a group of students demonstrated on the school lawn in support of Ramos. After a year long administrative leave and court hearing, Ramos was exonerated of all charges. The State Board of Education was ordered to reinstate Ramos as superintendent and to support Ramos in his efforts to change the school from a custodial school to an educational school. Laden with a legal bill of $80,000, Ramos agreed not to sue the State Board of Education for false allegations in exchange for a $180,000 settlement and resigning his position as superintendent. He resigned, paid his lawyers, and moved to Arizona.

Later years
After moving to Arizona In 2004, Ramos was appointed Superintendent of Sequoia School for the Deaf and Hard of Hearing, a charter school in Arizona with two campuses — in Mesa and Phoenix. Ramos transformed the school from an underperforming school to one of the few "Performing" schools for students who are Deaf and hard of hearing in the country. For his efforts in transforming SSDHH into a "Performing" school, he was recognized as Administrator of the Year and Principal of the Year. While Superintendent, the then Governor of Arizona, Janet Napolitano, appointed Ramos as a commissioner on the Arizona Commission for the Deaf and Hard of Hearing. The Assistant Secretary of Education later appointed Ramos to the National Technical Institute for the Deaf National Advisory Group.

After seven successful years at SSDHH and looking for another challenge, on July 30, 2011, the NJ Commissioner of Education, Dr. Christopher Cerf, appointed Ramos as Superintendent of the Marie Katzenbach School for the Deaf (MKSD) in NJ, with instructions to transformed to school into an educational school. For three years he worked closely with Commissioner Cerf to transform the school until Cerf's resignation in 2015. With Cerf's departure, the vision for MKSD changed and the focus was on bureaucracy instead of educating the students. Unwilling to work in this new climate, Ramos retired on June 30, 2015. Shortly after his retirement, Ramos created the first and only virtual school for students who are deaf and hard of hearing - The Princeton School - with the goal of providing supplemental assistance to schools and VR in their effort to help these students be successful adults.

Ramos currently is the principal of the Hawaii School for the Deaf and the Blind.

Writing
In 2003, Ramos published the book "Triumph of the Spirit: The DPN Chronicle", about the historic situation of deaf students at Gallaudet University.

See also

List of Puerto Ricans

References

1949 births
Living people
Puerto Rican educators
Ramos, Dr. Angel
American deaf people
Educators of the deaf
Gallaudet University alumni
State University of New York at Geneseo alumni